Sidney Schutte is a Dutch Chef. He fulfils the position of Executive Chef at the Waldorf Astoria Amsterdam and its fine dining restaurant Spectrum (formerly known as Librije's Zusje Amsterdam). Upon seven months of opening, Sidney Schutte managed to raise Librije's Zusje Amsterdam to the top and received two prestigious Michelin stars and a score of 18 Gault&Millau points. As of 2018, the Librije's Zusje Amsterdam is ranked at the 6th place out of 10, in the Dutch, Lekker magazine.

His second restaurant Goldfinch Brasserie opened in February 2015 and Sidney leads both kitchens with a strong personal signature.

Since December, 2016, Sidney Schutte started to lead another kitchen at Cocina de Autor, a restaurant at The Grand Velas Los Cabos Hotel in Cabo San Lucas, Mexico. His passion for traveling is one of the aspects that shaped his culinary style. At Cocina de Autor, Sidney aims to create a journey of flavours in his dishes through the palette of European, Asian and South American. In 2017, the restaurant has been named one of "The Best New Restaurants" by the CNN.

Earlier Life and Career 
Sidney (born in Middelburg, The Netherlands 1976) discovered his passion for food and the art of cooking at a young age. He left his hometown at the age of 18, driven by his ambition to become a chef. His training was extensive; he gained experience from prestigious chefs in restaurants such as Restaurant Der Bloasbalg (1 Michelin star) under the guidance of Jan Waghemans, Restaurant Scholteshof (2 Michelin stars) of Roger Souvereyns and De Librije (3 Michelin stars) headed by Jonnie Boer. Meanwhile, Sidney was acknowledged as “SVH Meesterkok”, which is the highest recognition that a chef can achieve in The Netherlands.

In 2010, Sidney started in the position of Executive Sous Chef at Restaurant Amber (2015 nr 4 San Pellegrino Asia’s 50 Best restaurants) in Hong Kong under the guidance of Richard Ekkebus. And in 2012 he was appointed as Executive Chef of The Landmark Mandarin Hotel Hong Kong. In 2014, Sidney decided to return to the Netherlands to fulfil the position of Executive Chef in the then soon-to open Waldorf Astoria Amsterdam. He received several impressive achievements throughout his career as an Executive Chef. As he managed the kitchen of Librije's Zusje Amsterdam, he was recognised as Chef of the Year in 2017 by Gault&Millau and was also ranked in number 65 on the list of "The Best Chef Award 2017", which applies for chefs from around the world. In addition, Sidney Schutte recently had the honour to serve his signature dishes for one month at the Ikarus restaurant in HANGAR 7, Salzburg, Austria.

Cooking Style 
Sidney’s strong personal signature is recognized by distinct flavors and that is transformed into a unique cuisine, which are mostly influenced by Asian flavors. Additionally, he presents a traditional dish in a contemporary way. Where the produce are obtained from both local and international  suppliers. For the majority of his dishes at the restaurant, he uses mainly seafood.

Restaurant Spectrum 

 https://www.restaurantspectrum.com

Restaurant Librije’s Zusje 

 http://www.librijeszusje.com/
 https://www.instagram.com/librijeadam/

Café Cliché 

 http://cafecliche.amsterdam

Media 

Voque 
http://www.vogue.com/13376970/new-best-dutch-food-sidney-schutte-librje-zusje-restaurant-amsterdam/

WBP stars
http://www.wbpstars.com/june-2016.html

Shanghai daily
http://www.shanghaidaily.com/feature/ideal/Crazy-chef-whose-recipes-make-perfect-sense/shdaily.shtml

Trip Reporter
http://tripreporter.co.uk/librijes-zusje-2/

Elizabethonfood
http://www.elizabethonfood.com/content/1472/2/Librije's_Zusje_at_the_Waldorf_Astoria_Hotel_in_Amsterdam_.html

References

1976 births
Living people
People from Middelburg, Zeeland
Dutch chefs